Oreshino is a village in the municipality of Ivaylovgrad, in Haskovo Province, in southern Bulgaria. It was known as "Kozluca" before 1934.

References

Villages in Haskovo Province